Ryan Adam Dobson (born 24 September 1806) is an English footballer, who played as a full back in the Football League for Chester City.

References

Chester City F.C. players
Association football fullbacks
English Football League players
Bridgnorth Town F.C. players
1978 births
Living people
English footballers